Clesh (clip load edit share) is a cloud-based video editing platform designed for the consumers, prosumers, and online communities to integrate user-generated content. The core technology is based on FORscene which is geared towards professionals working for example in broadcasting, news media, post production.

Video, audio, and graphical content is uploaded to Clesh via a standard web browser, a mobile device such as a phone / tablet, or desktop software for DV capture over FireWire.  The hosted material can then be reviewed, searched, edited, and published online by anyone with a standard web browser or compatible mobile device.

Clesh supports storyboard shot selection, frame-accurate editing, transitions and various other functions such as; pan, zoom, colour and light correction, and audio levels.  Content can be published in formats for example; Podcast, Mpeg2, HTML5 video or in a proprietary Java format.

Cloud-based software provides greater scope for sharing information and collaborating compared to LAN or desktop based systems.  Users of cloud-based software rely on the cloud's owner for adequate security, performance and resilience.

Clesh does not assert any rights over uploaded content in contrast to other platforms (such as YouTube). All rights to any content uploaded to Clesh remain with the Author.

Features
Some of the services available to Clesh users:
 Access via Java enabled desktops or Android smartphones or tablets
 Real-time video rendering including effects and transitions
 Multiple audio tracks
 Secured log-on
 Frame accurate timeline for fine cut editing
 Logging / meta-data annotation assigns text to portions of video (usable by Clesh and web search engines)
 Storyboard  assembles rough cuts using drag-and-drop
 Import, host, organise and search for media (DV tape and various video, audio, and still image formats)
 Publish content to in formats such as podcast, MPEG-2, web (Java Applet), Flash, Ogg, HTML5 and JPEG
 Chatrooms to talk to other Clesh users
 Showreel (a gallery for publishing material visible to internet users)
 Moderation for approval of material prior to distribution downstream
 Re-branding and integration support for white-label deployment

Technology
Clesh is based on the same technology as FORscene. An array of servers on the internet backbone provide the cloud computing platform to host Clesh.  As a white-label solution Clesh would be branded and hosted per the client requirement.

User Interface
End-users access Clesh with a rich user interface on clients such as standard Java-enabled Web Browsers and / or  Android enabled mobile devices such as tablets and smartphones.

History 

Clesh was launched January 2006 and subject to several upgrades during the year to extend functionality including; storyboard, podcasting, moderation, chat and a showreel. During 2007 consumers are offered Clesh via a subscription model. Upgrades include Web Start and graphics upload. Mr Paparazzi selects Clesh as the platform to host its video offering and TrueTube does the same in 2008 by choosing to use Clesh to manage its video portal. Several further upgrades are applied and include; better audio quality, image enhancement controls, transitions, fades, titles, and additional publishing options such as JPEG.  In 2010 a version of Clesh is demonstrated on an Android OS tablet device (Samsung Galaxy S Tab), and several upgrades are applied including; HTML5 publishing, pan, zoom, and overlays.

See also
Jaycut
Jumpcut
WeVideo

References

External links 

Cloud applications
Web hosting
Film and video technology
Video editing software
Web applications
Java platform software
Video hosting
Publishing software